Daniel James "Danny" Howland (born June 29, 1993), better known by his alias Svdden Death, is a Los Angeles-based DJ and producer from San Jose, California. He is known for his song "Sell Out", a collaboration with American multi-platinum artist Marshmello that peaked on Billboard's Hot Dance/Electronic Songs at the No. 36 position in early 2019. He makes high-energy music that falls into the genre of dubstep and riddim. Howland tours regularly in North America, and can be found on festival lineups all throughout festival season.

Early life
Howland grew up in San Jose, listening to Kraftwerk before being introduced to dubstep in 2008, listening to such artists as Benga, Skream, and Rusko. He later moved to Los Angeles and began producing electro house, hip-hop, and big room house under a previous alias to work out his particular sound and style. He had experience playing in various metal, indie, and jazz bands, usually playing the guitar, bass, and piano.

Career

2017: "Prismatic" and Rott N' Roll Pt. 1: Remixed
On June 2, English record label Never Say Die released Howland's song "Prismatic" as a single for their seventh Black Friday extended play releases on their Black Label sub-label. Bianca Silva of Bassrush praised the song as "effortlessly destructive in the best way possible", marking it as a song fit for mosh pitting.

2018: Junkworld EP, Voyd Vol. I, and SoundCloud
On February 2, 2018, Howland collaborated with San Francisco-based dubstep producer Somnium Sound to release the song "Angel Style" through the record label Buygore. Writing for T.H.E. - Music Essentials, Akshay Bhanawat described the song as a "sonic concoction" that was set to be an "instant classic in the world of dubstep" as well as the then-upcoming festival season, as the song had previously been played by various electronic music disk jockeys in their live-sets, including Dirtyphonics, Must Die!, Excision, 12th Planet, Slander, and Snails.

On February 16, Israeli electronic dance music producer and DJ Borgore collaborated with Howland to release the song "Svddengore" (a portmanteau of the two artists name) via Borgore's record label Buygore. Writing for EDM Sauce, Erik Mahal noted the song as being on the "edge of full-scale riddim" because of its various rhythmic elements as well as being a collaboration that many fans of either artist had "been dreaming about for years, and shockingly it easily lives up to the hype."

On February 26, Howland released his second extended play Junkworld via Never Say Die, featuring five songs on its tracklist. Your EDM's Matthew Meadow heavily praised the extended play, stating that it was "easily one of the strongest dubstep releases of the year so far", noting its "crazy inventive" sound design and arrangement and individually reviewing the song "Caught in a Mosh" as being "incredibly unique" in its arrangement and sounds. This Song Is Sick's Langston Thomas premiered the song "Surrender", a collaboration with riddim producer Subtronics, writing Howland had taken his sound design "to the next level" and that the style of each artist "mix perfectly" in the song.

On March 30, Dallas-based electronic music producer AFK collaborated with Howland to release the song "BZZRK" via the record label Bassrush. Bella Bagshaw of Dancing Astronaut described the song as a "screeching, chop-heavy riddim tune", in colouration to the "blast heat" vocal sample used in the song. A 5-track remix extended play for the song was later released on December 5.

On July 30, Howland self-released his third extended play Voyd Vol. I, featuring three solo tracks and two collaborations with fellow producers MVRDA and SampliFire. Jordan Mafi of Nest HQ stated that the extended play will stand as a benchmark of the dubstep sub-genre riddim, noting that the songs featured on it had been well-known dubplates that have previously only been heard by his collaborators as well as being prominently featured in his live-sets months before release.

On September 14, Quebec-based "vomitstep" producer Snails released a 10-track remix album of his album The Shell. The album featured Howland's remix of the song "Smack Up", featuring Foreign Beggars as vocals, alongside various other electronic dance music artists such as Virtual Riot, Kompany, Kill the Noise, and FuntCase.

In mid-November 2018, multiple bass music producers had most or all of their songs removed from online audio distribution platform and music sharing website SoundCloud for wrongful copyright claims. Among these producers were Howland, who had all of his tracks falsely copyright struck and removed from his account. Speaking in a statement to Your EDM, Howland spoke on the matter, stating that "SoundCloud is ruining the dubstep community by allowing anyone to claim a song as their own and remove it from existence. Until they fix their takedown policy, I will no longer be uploading songs to this platform."

On November 30, American electronic music producer and DJ Marshmello released part two of the remixes to his song "Happier", with Howland being featured as the second song on the extended play, alongside Jauz, West Coast Massive, Matt Medved, Hikeii, and Tim Gunther.

2019: "Sell Out", "Ichor", and subsequent releases
On January 4, 2019, Howland collaborated with dubstep producers Oolacile and Ubur to release the song "Savceboys" as a free download. Bassrush's Chris Muniz called the riddim song "laser-focused and razor-sharp throughout each section" and sounds like it was not just designed to "showcase the vibe and sound of each producer but is determined to take listeners on a proper journey through the underbelly of this beast."

On February 8, Howland collaborated with Marshmello to release the riddim track "Sell Out" via the latter's record label Joytime Collective. The track was marked as Marshmello's first collaboration with a "serious" dubstep producer to make a dubstep track, with Svdden Death being known as having "some of the heaviest sets around right now" as described by a writer of Your EDM. Although the song did attract favourable reviews towards the song, such as Billboard's Kat Bein review of the song, Christina Hernandez of Dancing Astronaut gave the song a much more negative and critical review, describing its production as extremely "cookie-cutter" and that the song was simply "an easy cop-out to increase variety and maintain Marshmello’s hold over the EDM world at large."

On April 19, Howland self-released the song "Ichor" featuring American rapper Ace Savage as vocals. ThisSongSlaps Brian Bonavoglia praised the song, stating that it served up "masterful production" and wrote that it sounded as if it was to simply "created to deliver devastating damage wherever it may make an appearance."

On June 7, American dubstep artist Space Laces released the remixes of his extended play Overdrive via Never Say Die, with Howland being featured as one of the remixers alongside various other electronic music producers such as Kompany and Gammer. Writing for EDM.com, Sarah Kocur reviewed Howland's remix of the song "Choppaz", noting it as one of the most distinctive on the extended play, writing that he gave the original song a "heavy twist for which he's known."

On August 2, Howland self-released the single "Modern Sorcery" as a digital download, with Brian Bonavoglia of ThisSongSlaps noting the song as a "coveted" within the bass music scene before its release and describing it as a "relentless chest-thumping anthem that was bred to destroy."

Artistry
Howland had stated that Svdden Death was a desire to do "more advanced things with production", specifically choosing to produce dubstep as the genre is "much more technical than other genres" and gives him more freedom in his production. Originally using Ableton Live, he later switched to Reason to produce music and moving away from software synthesizers Serum and Massive to Reason's Malström as he wanted to move away from digital audio workstations and synthesizers that are commonly used by other dubstep and riddim producers.

Howland takes on a significantly darker, more metal-influenced style whenever he releases a Voyd project, leading some of his fans to see Voyd''' as a side-alias of Svdden Death. In an interview with Run the Trap, Howland clarified that "[Voyd is] more of a continuation of like a darker and heavier style of my music. With Svdden Death I want to branch out and do more melodic stuff. I still think Voyd is the kind of music I get into when I'm mad or really stressed."

Howland had been included in various "artists to watch" lists by several online electronic music magazines. Billboard Dance had listed Howland, alongside Elley Duhé, Detlef, Kittens, and Artbat, in their August 2018 edition of "Ones to Watch". Writers for Your EDM, Noiseporn, and EDM Sauce had included him in their respective "artists to watch in 2019" lists, placing him alongside such artists like 1788-L, Kompany, Blanke, Tynan, Fytch and Wildlyf.

Discography
Albums and EPs
 Spelljam EP,  June 12, 2017 (Never Say Die: Black Label) digital downloadJunkworld EP, February 26, 2018 (Never Say Die), digital download
 Voyd Vol. I, July 30, 2018 (self-released), digital download
 Bzzrk Remixes (with AFK), December 5, 2018 (Bassrush), digital download
 Voyd Vol. 1.5, August 9, 2019 (self-released), digital download
 Voyd Vol. II'', March 18, 2022 (self-released), digital download

As a featured artist

Charted singles

Other singles

Remixes

References

Dubstep musicians
1993 births
Living people
American DJs
American male composers
21st-century American composers
Musicians from California
Record producers from California
American electronic musicians
21st-century American male musicians